Tareq Ziad Jabr Khattab is a Jordanian footballer who plays as a defender for Al-Wehdat and the Jordan national team.

International career
Tareq first joined the senior national team a month before the 2012 WAFF Championship in Kuwait, but did not play in any matches until Jordan played against Nigeria in Amman on 28 October 2013 in an international friendly, which resulted in a 1–0 win for Jordan.

International career statistics

International goals
Scores and results list Jordan's goal tally first.

Honours

Al-Wehdat
Jordan Premier League (1): 2013–14
Jordan FA Cup (1): 2013–14
Jordan FA Shield (1): 2017
Jordan Super Cup (1): 2011, 2014

Al-Shabab
Saudi Super Cup (1): 2014

References

External links 
 
 
 

1992 births
Living people
Jordanian footballers
Jordan international footballers
Jordan youth international footballers
Jordanian people of Palestinian descent
Al-Wehdat SC players
Al-Shabab FC (Riyadh) players
Al Salmiya SC players
Al Masry SC players
Association football defenders
2015 AFC Asian Cup players
2019 AFC Asian Cup players
Sportspeople from Amman
Saudi Professional League players
Expatriate footballers in Kuwait
Jordanian expatriate sportspeople in Kuwait
Jordanian expatriate footballers
Expatriate footballers in Saudi Arabia
Jordanian expatriate sportspeople in Saudi Arabia
Expatriate footballers in Egypt
Jordanian expatriate sportspeople in Egypt